Altenbeuthen is a municipality in the district Saalfeld-Rudolstadt, in Thuringia, Germany.

History
Within the German Empire (1871–1918), Altenbeuthen was part of the Prussian Province of Saxony.

References

Saalfeld-Rudolstadt